Chimpanzee stool associated circular virus is a single stranded DNA virus isolated from chimpanzee stool. This proposed species has not yet been accepted by the ICTV.

Genome
The genome is ~2.6 kilobases in length and encodes two open reading frames (ORFs). The larger of the ORFs encodes the replicase gene and the other the putative capsid protein. A stem-loop and TATA boxes are present in the non coding parts of the sequence.

Taxonomy
This virus appears to be related to the bovine stool associated circular virus, which is apparently a synonym of porcine stool-associated circular virus.

Chimpanzee stool associated circular virus appears to be an unclassified member species of ICTV-accepted genus Porprismacovirus (Smacoviridae), just like porcine stool-associated circular virus.

References

Single-stranded DNA viruses
Unaccepted virus taxa